Caroline Weldon (born Susanna Karolina Faesch; December 4, 1844March 15, 1921) was a Swiss-American artist and activist with the National Indian Defense Association.  Weldon became a confidante and the personal secretary to the Lakota Sioux Indian leader Sitting Bull during the time when Plains Indians had adopted the Ghost Dance movement.

Early life and education 
Caroline Weldon was born Susanna Karolina Faesch on December 4, 1844, in Kleinbasel, Canton Basel, Switzerland. Her father was Johann Lukas Faesch, a career Swiss military officer serving in a Swiss regiment in France. Her mother was Anna Maria Barbara, née Marti. She was a member of the Faesch family, who were part of the Swiss nobility. 

She immigrated to America in 1852, together with her mother, settling in Brooklyn, New York. That year, her mother was remarried to the exiled German revolutionary and physician, Dr. Karl Heinrich Valentiny, who ran a medical practice in Brooklyn. In 1866, Susanna Carolina Faesch was married in Brooklyn to Dr. Bernhard Claudius Schlatter, a physician and fellow Swiss. Her marriage to Schlatter proved to be childless and unhappy. 

In June 1876, she ran away with a married man identified in court records as Christopher J. Stevenson. Briefly residing with Stevenson in a rented apartment in Hoboken, New Jersey, she gave birth to a boy, she named Christie, in late 1876 or early 1877. Her relationship with Stevenson deteriorated, and he soon abandoned her to return to his wife of many years. Caroline returned to Brooklyn to live with her mother and stepfather. Her estranged husband Bernhard Schlatter filed for divorce which was granted in 1883.

Career 

Following her desertion by Stevenson and her divorce from Bernhard Schlatter, Weldon became committed to the cause of Native Americans. Upon her mother's death in 1887, she inherited some money which gave her the means to pursue her interests freely, including her interest in art. Sometime thereafter, she changed her name to Caroline Weldon, presumably to allow her to put her past behind her, although her exact reasons for this action remain unknown.

In the summer of 1889, Caroline Weldon traveled to Dakota Territory to fulfill her dream of living among the Sioux. She joined the National Indian Defense Association (NIDA), headed by Dr. Thomas Bland and his wife Cora Bland. Weldon began to aid the Sioux in their struggle to fight the US government's attempt via the Dawes Act to expropriate vast portions of the Great Sioux Reservation for the purpose of opening some up for white settlement and with the intent of rendering the creations of the two new states of North Dakota and South Dakota economically viable. Weldon befriended Sitting Bull, leader of the traditionalist faction among the Sioux, and she acted as his secretary, interpreter, and advocate. She painted four portraits of Sitting Bull, two of which are known to have survived. One is now held by the North Dakota Historical Society in Bismarck, North Dakota, and the other at the Historic Arkansas Museum in Little Rock, Arkansas.

After she had moved with her young son Christie to live at Sitting Bull's compound on the Grand River at Standing Rock Indian Reservation, her confrontations and open defiance of Indian Agent James McLaughlin engendered enmity. McLaughlin initiated a smear campaign, resulting in her being reviled by much of the white community and vilified in the national press. When the Ghost Dance Movement swept through the Indian Reservations of the West in the summer of 1890, she denounced the movement. Weldon warned Sitting Bull that the Ghost Dance movement would give the government a pretext to harm him and to summon the military for intervention which would destroy the Sioux Nation. Sitting Bull turned against her and, upon her son falling ill in November, she decided to leave.

While traveling via riverboat to her new home in Kansas City, Missouri, her son died near Pierre, South Dakota, on November 19, 1890. The subsequent events of Sitting Bull's murder on December 15, 1890, and the Wounded Knee massacre on December 29, 1890, added to her sense of futility and failure. She lived briefly in the Kansas City with her nephew Friedrich William Schleicher, a school teacher, only to return eventually to Brooklyn. She disappeared into obscurity soon after.

Later life 

Weldon died alone in her Brooklyn apartment on March 15, 1921. The cause of death was accidental third degree burns to her face and body caused by a fire that was sparked by a candle. She was interred at the Valentiny family plot at Green Wood Cemetery in Brooklyn, New York.

Legacy 
The poet and playwright Derek Walcott refers to Weldon and her life in his play The Ghost Dance and in his epic poem Omeros.  He features Native American history together with that of the demise of the Native Arawak people in St. Lucia, in the Caribbean.

The film Woman Walks Ahead chronicles Weldon's life among the Sioux.

Green-Wood Cemetery in Brooklyn, N.Y., celebrated Women's History Month by hosting a special trolley tour called "Women Who Walked Ahead" on 31 March 2018 and it included the graves (both marked and unmarked) of notable women from Brooklyn, including Caroline Weldon.

References 

1844 births
1921 deaths
American expatriates in Switzerland
Swiss emigrants to the United States
Caroline
Artists from Basel-Stadt
Native Americans' rights activists
People from Brooklyn
Burials at Green-Wood Cemetery
Activists from New York (state)